Paenalcaligenes hominis is a bacterium from the genus Paenalcaligenes which has been isolated from human blood in Gothenburg in Sweden.

References 

 

Burkholderiales
Bacteria described in 2010